Clebern Hilburn "Bobby" Shows Jr. (August 28, 1938 – January 20, 2019) was an American Republican politician.

Shows went to the University of Southern Mississippi and was a businessman. From 1992 to 2016, served as member of the Mississippi House of Representatives from the 89th District.

He was a Democrat until 2010, when he switched affiliation to the Republican party, justifying by saying that “The majority leader, Mr. Ellis, (said) that you can see at this time that there is no room in the Democratic Party for white conservatives, so I am here to be a white conservative Republican.”

References

1938 births
2019 deaths
People from Laurel, Mississippi
Mississippi Republicans
Members of the Mississippi House of Representatives
Mississippi Democrats
21st-century American politicians
People from Jones County, Mississippi
University of Southern Mississippi alumni
Businesspeople from Mississippi
20th-century American businesspeople